is a Japanese journalist and businessman, who is the president of Chunichi Shimbun and owner of Nippon Professional Baseball team, the Chunichi Dragons.

Early life

Shirai attended the predecessor to Aichi Prefectural Seisho High School for his middle school education, and graduated from Shizuoka Senior High School.

Career

Chunichi Shimbun Co.
In 1949 Shirai started working at Chubu Nippon Shimbun Co. (Now Chunichi Shimbun Co.)

As a journalist, Shirai covered violent crimes within the society department. While working with the society department he edited "Retsujitsu Saipantō" (The Blazing Sun of Saipan) in 1979, a book touching on the experiences of Japanese soldiers in Saipan during World War II. Throughout his career at the company he held various positions within the Nagoya head office including department head of accounting, head of the Nagoya head office editing department and managing director.

From 2007, Shirai has served as president and chairman of Chunichi Shimbun and the Chunichi Dragons.

Shirai is also on the board of the Japan Association of Major Theaters as well as previously serving on the board of Meijo University in Nagoya.

Chunichi Dragons
Shirai is known to have a close relationship with former Dragons player, manager and general manager Hiromitsu Ochiai whom he helped bring to the team. After the Dragons lost to the Nippon Ham Fighters in the 2006 Japan Series Shirai stood by then manager, Ochiai and kept him on for the  season ultimately leading to Chunichi's first Japan Series win in 53 years.

Shirai is also known to have a dislike of the long-serving Kazuyoshi Tatsunami to a point where the player is convinced that he will never be manager of the team while the president remains in charge.

References

See also
Chunichi Dragons
Chunichi Shimbun

1928 births
Living people
20th-century Japanese businesspeople
21st-century Japanese businesspeople
Baseball executives
Chunichi Dragons
Japanese chairpersons of corporations
Japanese chief executives
Japanese sports businesspeople
People from Tahara, Aichi
Chunichi Shimbun people